Park Ji-hwan (born September 5, 1980) is a South Korean actor. He initially appeared in Yellow Hair (1999) and made his feature film debut in The City of Violence (2006). Since then, Park has performed in numerous movies and television dramas, including The Outlaws (2017), Untouchable (2017), and Black Dog (2019). Initially interested in a career in fashion design, Park changed track and decided to attend the Korean Academy of Film Arts. After working in many projects as a minor character, he has recently played more central roles, including that of a conflicted single father in Our Blues (2022).

Filmography

Film

Television series

Web series

Television shows

Awards and nominations

References

External links 
  Park Ji-hwan at the Korean Film Council
  Park Ji-hwan at HanCinema
 
  Park Ji-hwan at Rotten Tomatoes

1980 births
Living people
20th-century South Korean male actors
21st-century South Korean male actors
South Korean male television actors
South Korean male film actors